Falcuna lybia is a butterfly in the family Lycaenidae. It is found in Cameroon, Gabon and the Republic of the Congo. The habitat consists of primary forests.

References

Butterflies described in 1892
Poritiinae
Butterflies of Africa